Coada Izvorului may refer to several villages in Romania:

 Coada Izvorului, a village in Petrești, Dâmbovița
 Coada Izvorului, a village in Măneşti, Prahova